Touwfabriek Langman (Langman Ropes) is one of the oldest rope making companies in Europe.

The company is based in Nijkerk, Netherlands.

History
The company was founded in 1638 in Nijkerk, Netherlands. They originally made ropes from hemp and flax, mainly for use in the fishing and farming industries. In 1893, the company was sold by Evert van Sweden to Lebbert Langman.  It has been run by members of the Langman family since then.

In popular culture
The company supplied ship ropes for the Pirates of the Caribbean series of movies.

See also
 Ropewalk
 List of oldest companies

References

Ropework